The Peter and Maria Larson House is a historic residence located in Astoria, Oregon, United States.

The house was listed on the National Register of Historic Places in 1990.

See also
National Register of Historic Places listings in Clatsop County, Oregon

References

External links

1884 establishments in Oregon
Gothic Revival architecture in Oregon
Houses completed in 1884
Houses on the National Register of Historic Places in Astoria, Oregon